John Elwood Schweitz (born April 19, 1960) is a retired American basketball player in the National Basketball Association (NBA). A 6'6" (1.98 m) and 210 lb (95 kg) shooting guard, Schweitz, from Waterloo, New York and the University of Richmond, was selected by the Boston Celtics with the 23rd pick in the 6th round (138 overall) of the 1982 NBA Draft. He played in two NBA seasons, for the Seattle SuperSonics and Detroit Pistons.

Schweitz was head men's basketball coach at Francis Marion University (FMU) for six seasons from July 2000 until March 2006, when his contract was not renewed. Prior to his stint with FMU, he served as an assistant coach with Loyola Marymount University, Irvine Valley Community College, and Long Beach State. While in high school, Schweitz was named to the New York State Sportswriters Association boys' basketball all-star first-team for small schools.

Notes

External links
NBA stats @ basketballreference.com

1960 births
Living people
Albany Patroons players
American men's basketball players
Basketball coaches from New York (state)
Basketball players from New York (state)
Boston Celtics draft picks
Cincinnati Slammers players
College men's basketball head coaches in the United States
Detroit Pistons players
Francis Marion Patriots men's basketball coaches
Maine Lumberjacks players
People from Waterloo, New York
Richmond Spiders men's basketball players
Seattle SuperSonics players
Shooting guards